Ben Yagoda (born 22 February 1954) is an American writer and educator. He is a professor of journalism and English at the University of Delaware.

Early life
Born in New York City to Louis Yagoda (1909-1990), a labor mediator and arbitrator with the New York State Mediation Board, visiting lecturer at the Cornell University School of Industrial and Labor Relations, and a former organizer for the Amalgamated Clothing Workers of America, and Harriet (née Lewis), he grew up in New Rochelle, New York. He entered Yale University to study English in 1971 and graduated in 1976 with a bachelor of arts. He later earned an M.A. in American civilization at the University of Pennsylvania, in 1991.

Career
He became a freelance journalist for publications such as The New Leader, The New York Times, Newsweek, and Rolling Stone. He has published a number of books including About Town: The New Yorker and the World it Made.

Besides his work as a journalism and English professor at the University of Delaware, Yagoda also writes occasionally for a New York Times blog about the English language.

Personal life
Yagoda resides in Swarthmore, Pennsylvania with his wife. They have two daughters.

Selected bibliography
Will Rogers: A Biography (Alfred A. Knopf, 1993)
The Art of Fact: A Historical Anthology of Literary Journalism (Scribner, 1997), co-edited with Kevin Kerrane
About Town: The New Yorker and the World It Made (Scribner, 2000)
The Sound on the Page: Style and Voice in Writing (HarperResource, 2004)
When You Catch an Adjective, Kill It: The Parts of Speech, for Better and/or Worse (Broadway Books, 2007)
Memoir: A History (Riverhead Books, 2008)
How to Not Write Bad: The Most Common Writing Problems and How to Avoid Them (Riverhead Books, 2013)
The B-Side: The Death of Tin Pan Alley and the Rebirth of the Great American Song (Riverhead Books, 2015)

Notes

External links

Ben Yagoda papers, Special Collections, University of Delaware Library, Newark, Delaware.
"My Life as a Hack. It was glorious. Now it's over." at Slate, 26 August 2005, announcing retirement from freelance journalism

1954 births
Living people
Writers from New Rochelle, New York
Writers of books about writing fiction
University of Delaware faculty
Yale College alumni
Educators from New York City